Leptidea reali, the Réal's wood white, is a butterfly of the family Pieridae.

Appearance, behaviour and distribution

Réal's wood white has been found in many western Europe countries but has not been found in Britain. In Ireland, where it was only positively identified in 2001, it is more common and far more widespread than the wood white (L. sinapis). Since it looks and behaves like its close relative further research is needed to discover its true distribution, indeed on the continent its current known distribution is suspiciously patchy. The only conclusive way to separate the two species is by close examination of the genitalia.

A 2011 study concludes that L. reali is one of three members of a cryptic species complex which  comprises L. sinapis and a new species L. juvernica. This study was based on karyotype analysis and analysis of mitochondrial nuclear DNA markers. L. reali was found to occur only in Spain, Italy and southern France. L. juvernica ranges from Ireland and France in the west to Kazakhstan in the east. Measurements of genitalia for the three species allow separation of these two species from L. sinapis, L. juvernica and L. reali could not be separated based on genitalia measurements. L. juvernica is also named the cryptic wood white.

Field lepidopterists have reported behavioural differences between L. reali and L. sinapis with Réal's being described as a stronger flier and with a preference for more open habitats. It had also been noted that specimens from Ireland thought to L. sinapis had a noticeably stronger green tinge.

Life cycle and food plants

The life cycle, flight period and food plants appear at present to be similar to the wood white.

References

David Tomlinson & Rob Sill  Britain's Butterflies Wild Guides
Nelson, B., Hughes M., Nash, R. and Warren, M.S., 2001 Leptidea reali Reissinger 1989 a butterfly species new to Britain and Ireland.  Entomologist's Record and Journal of  Variation 113: 97-101.
Nash, R., Hughes, M., Nelson, B., and Warren, M., 2001 Real's Wood White Leptidea reali Reissinger, 1989 A Butterfly new to Britain and Ireland Atropos 14: 12-15.

External links
Butterfly Conservation Ireland Summary of the sinapis cryptic species complex.

Leptidea
Butterflies of Europe